Alexander or Alec Dick may refer to:
Alexander Dick (cricketer) (1922–2018), Australian cricketer
Alexander Dick (politician) (1827–1867), Australian politician
 Alex Dick (1894–1958), Scottish footballer
Alec Dick (footballer) (1865–1925), Scottish footballer
Sir Alexander Dick, 3rd Baronet (1703–1785), Scottish landowner and physician